Odiongan, officially the Municipality of Odiongan (Asi: Banwa it Odiongan, Filipino: Bayan ng Odiongan,  is a 2nd class municipality in the province of Romblon, Philippines. According to the 2020 census, it has a population of 49,284 people. It is composed of 25 barangays.

It is a major port, commercial center and the largest municipality in Romblon in terms of population and income. It's zip code is 5505.

History

Early history
There is a legend that the inhabitants there found an "odiong" (local term for "arrow") struck onto a tree; thus, the place was called inodiongan, meaning "struck by an arrow", which later metamorphosed to Odiongan.

Historically, Odiongan, as the largest municipality on Tablas Island, Romblon, was first inhabited by the Negritos and the Mangyan tribes from Panay Island to the south and Mindoro Island to the north, respectively. This was followed shortly by Onhan-speaking settlers from Panay. Around 1810, a group of Bantoanon-speaking people settled in the area in search of a place more suitable for agriculture. However, the settlement founded by these Bantoanons were destroyed and pillaged by Muslim pirates. In 1840, another attempt was made by a different group of Bantoanons; this time, they constructed a fort or cota which protected the settlement from attacks and natural calamities. In 1855, the settlement was officially designated by the Spanish colonial authorities as a pueblo or town. When the Philippine Revolution broke out in 1898, the town joined the cause of the revolutionaries led by Tomas Fiedacan and became the first mayor of Odiongan on 1898 to 1899.

Modern history
During the American colonial period in the Philippines, Odiongan faced a number of catastrophes: a cholera epidemic in 1902 killed much of the town's population, a strong typhoon lashed the town in 1908, and famine struck the town in 1914. However, the perseverance and determination of the townsfolk led to the town's continuous existence.

In 1940, the town became the seat of the special municipality of Tablas, created by virtue of Commonwealth Act No. 581 (authored by Congressman Leonardo Festin), which covered the entire island. It remained so throughout the Japanese occupation of the Philippines from 1941 to 1945. During that time, Odiongan was chosen as the headquarters of the resistance movement in the province, under the leadership of Lt. Col. Enrique Jurado. On 4 September 1943, a Japanese gunboat shelled the town to force the guerrillas out of hiding. This was followed the following month by a landing of Japanese forces from Panay, which massacred people in the various towns of Tablas, Romblon, and Sibuyan, including Odiongan.

On 1 October 1946, the special municipality of Tablas was abolished by Republic Act No. 38. The following year, Odiongan was restored to its original jurisdiction as municipality in the province of Romblon.

Geography
Odiongan is located in the mid-western part of Tablas Island. It is bounded by San Andres and San Agustin to the north, by Santa Maria to the east, by Looc and Alcantara to the south, and by Ferrol and Tablas Strait to the west.

Much of the town lies in the low-lying plains along the coast, with rolling hills and mountainous forest area at the interior. It has a good anchorage in Barangay Poctoy which serves as link between the islands of Mindoro , Panay and to the luzon island via Batangas or Lucena .

Climate

Barangays
Odiongan is politically subdivided into 25 barangays. Budiong was formerly a sitio of Canduyong; it became a barrio in 1954.

Demographics

According to the 2015 census, it has a population of 45,367 people, making it the most populous municipality in the province. Asi language is the native language of majority of the municipality's inhabitants, while Onhan is the medium of communication in southern barangays bordering Ferrol and Looc municipalities respectively.

Most of the town's inhabitants are devout Roman Catholic and Philippine Independent Church (Independent Catholic) adherents with a small population of Protestants, including Baptists, Iglesia ni Cristo, Foursquare Gospel, Assemblies of God, Seventh-day Adventists, and Jehovah's Witnesses.

Economy

Government

Pursuant to Chapter II, Title II, Book III of Republic Act 7160 or the Local Government Code of 1991, the municipal government is composed of a mayor (alkalde), a vice mayor (bise alkalde) and members (kagawad) of the legislative branch Sangguniang Bayan alongside a secretary to the said legislature, all of which are elected to a three-year term and are eligible to run for three consecutive terms. The incumbent mayor of Odiongan is Trina Alejandra Fabic y Firmalo y Que.The incumbent Vice Mayor Diven Fos Dimaala.

Notable personalities
 Renato Solidum Jr. – Secretary of DOST, 2022-present; Director of PHIVOLCS, 2003–2022
 Ephraim Fajutagana – twelfth Supreme Bishop of the Philippine Independent Church (2011–2017)

References

External links

Odiongan Profile at PhilAtlas.com
Odiongan Profile - Cities and Municipalities Competitive Index
Odiongan Homepage
Odiongan Romblon Hotel Reservations 
[ Philippine Standard Geographic Code]
Philippine Census Information

Municipalities of Romblon
Port cities and towns in the Philippines